Howl is a 2015 British horror film directed by Paul Hyett and starring Ed Speleers, Sean Pertwee, Holly Weston, Shauna Macdonald, Elliot Cowan, Rosie Day, Calvin Dean, Duncan Preston and Ross Mullan.

Plot
Howl opens with Alpha Trax train guard Joe Griffin (Ed Speleers) doing a shift on a overnight passenger train, which is scheduled to depart London at midnight. The regular guard, is sick. His only consolation is the chance to spend time with his unrequited love, the tea-trolley girl, Ellen (Holly Weston). A shot of the full moon is shown piecing through a heavy thunderstorm as the train travels.

A few miles before reaching the final station, Eastborough, the train is nearly derailed in a forested area when it hits a deer. The driver is forced to make an emergency stop to check the situation and finds the dead deer stuck to the wheels, which he tries to remove. As he struggles with the deer carcass, a nearby werewolf attacks and kills him. Unaware of the dangers outside, the remaining passengers, Kate (Shauna Macdonald), Adrian (Elliot Cowan), Matthew (Amit Shah), Billy (Sam Gittins), Nina (Rosie Day), Paul (Calvin Dean), and Ged (Duncan Preston) and his wife Jenny (Ania Marson), are frustrated to learn that an emergency team will not be able to reach the train due to downed trees all along the line, so they persuade Joe and Ellen into letting them off the train to attempt to walk to Eastborough Instead. Soon, Joe and Ellen find the driver's eviscerated body as they walk through the woods, leading them to rush everyone back to the train, but a werewolf pursues them and bites Jenny's leg before she is pulled to safety.

As the others bandage Jenny's wound, Joe tries to call for help again but receives no response. Eventually, everyone realizes that none of them have cell phone reception, because of a broken antenna on the train's roof. Billy, an engineering student, determines that the fuel lines were damaged and leaking, which needed repair in order for the train to continue moving. Meanwhile, the werewolf tries to force its way into the cabin but is unable to penetrate the metal roof or double-paned windows. Later, when it climbs up on the roof of the train, the cellphone reception comes on and Nina's phone begins to ring. When she moves into a less secure area of the car, the werewolf smashes through the window and pulls her out.

The remaining passengers barricade themselves in another car, using the train's power tools to reinforce the windows and doors with metal grates.
Paul is killed when the werewolf manages to enter the car through the bathroom roof while he is dealing with diarrhea. The werewolf proceeds to break through the passengers' barricades, but the passengers fight together and kill it. Matthew recognizes the creature as a werewolf, leading Adrian to recall that someone bitten by a werewolf will become one. Thus, despite the objections of others', Adrian tries to kill Jenny, who is becoming disoriented, coughing up blood, and spitting out her teeth, before becoming a werewolf herself. Joe knocks Adrian unconscious, then has the others tie him up along with Jenny.

Unaware that the werewolf's death cries have alerted the rest of its pack, Billy and Joe attempt to repair the train so it can be driven to safety. As Joe and Ellen monitor the console, Billy goes out to fix the fuel lines. Matthew comes out to help protect him, but he runs into the forest when he hears a voice calling for help. He discovers Nina being eaten alive by a werewolf before he is attacked and killed himself. As the train begins to move again, the werewolf pack snatches Kate, who dies.

Jenny eventually transforms into a full werewolf and kills her husband, before trying to kill Adrian, but Joe kills her. Unfortunately, the other werewolves manage to board the train, and Adrian traps Joe and Ellen to cover his escape. Billy tries to beat off the werewolves with torches but is killed, while Joe and Ellen flee into the forest, pursued by the pack. Realizing they will not make it, Joe stays behind to fight them as Ellen safely makes it to the nearest station. Although Joe fights bravely, he is bitten by the chief werewolf and transforms into a werewolf. Shortly after, Adrian stumbles onto the scene and is attacked by the newly transformed Joe, while the other werewolves watch him from close.

Cast 
 Ed Speleers as Joe; the train guard and the main protagonist
 Holly Weston as Ellen; Joe's co-worker and the female protagonist
 Sean Pertwee as Train Driver Tony
 Shauna Macdonald as Kate
 Elliot Cowan as Adrian
 Amit Shah as Matthew
 Sam Gittins as Billy
 Rosie Day as Nina
 Duncan Preston as Ged
 Ania Marson as Jenny
 Calvin Dean as Paul, the drunken football yob
 Brett Goldstein as David, the new Supervisor
 Ryan Oliva as Scar Werewolf
 Robert Nairne as Hunchback Werewolf
 Ross Mullan as Blonde Werewolf

Production
Howl was directed by Paul Hyett, previously known for his effects collaborations with fellow British horror film director Neil Marshall. Hyett had previously been a special effects, creature, prosthetic and make-up designer for Marshall's earlier films such as Doomsday, The Descent, Centurion, and Dog Soldiers; the latter 2002 film also a werewolf movie. Actress Shauna Macdonald played the lead role Sarah in The Descent, and also has a starring role in Howl. Sean Pertwee starred in Dog Soldiers and also has a role in Howl. Paul Hyett also worked on the effects for the British horror films The Woman in Black and Attack the Block.

The interior train shots were filmed in Croydon, London, and London Waterloo station in Lambeth. Exterior shots were filmed in the Black Park Country Park adjacent to Pinewood Studios.

Marketing and release

Marketing
The Horror Addict channel on YouTube premiered the official trailer for Howl on 13 May 2015. The video currently has almost two and a half million views. A total of three different official trailers for the film were released over the summer.

Four different film posters have been released; one showing a bloodied, inhuman claw in the sky, hovering over the train, and variations of; one of the glowing eyes looking through a window over bloodstained seats; and the final poster is a bloodied human hand on the window, with a full moon outside.

Release
The film had no theatrical release but was shown at several international film festivals before its release on home video. Howl first premiered at Fantasy Filmfest, which was held in Germany on 5 August 2015. It was subsequently shown at FrightFest in the United Kingdom on 31 August, and Popcorn Frights Film Festival in the United States on 3 October.

The DVD release date was initially set for 16 October, but has been pushed back closer to Halloween at 26 October. The DVD will be age-rated 18 in the UK market due to disturbing imagery and graphic and bloody violence.

Reception
The film was met with a generally positive response and currently has 63% on Rotten Tomatoes, based on 16 reviews.

Kate Muir of The Times negatively likened the film to Snakes on a Plane, giving it two out of five stars. "Soon, it all gets bloody as the (somewhat unconvincing) lycanthrope goes loco on the locomotive."

Luiz H. C., one of the critics of horror film magazine and website Bloody Disgusting, gave the film a positive review with three-and-a-half out of five stars, saying that: "Howl is a fun and frightening romp." Pat Torfe, also of Bloody Disgusting, gave the film four out of five stars, saying that: "Howl lives up to its title in many ways."

Kim Newman of Empire Magazine gave the film three out of five stars, and said of the film: "An unashamed B-movie, but unashamed fun." Mark Kermode of The Observer: "Engagingly sympathetic portrayals of stoical working women and harassed railway guards keep us on side as the action rattles through familiar generic junctions." Hannah McGill of The List: "The black humour hits home without breaking the tension, while the gore - as one might expect given Hyett's background in makeup effects - is grimly convincing." Garry McConnachie of The Daily Record: "There's still much to admire and enjoy."

Mark McConnell of paranormal magazine Fortean Times gave the movie 8 out of 10, saying: "The film's climax made me wonder if it wasn't the director's exploration of interpersonal relationships between men and women that made me want to watch it a second time. Hats off to Hyett, who has taken the mundane British Rail journey and turned it into a feast of bloody horror."

References

External links

2015 comedy horror films
2015 films
British action horror films
British black comedy films
British comedy horror films
British satirical films
Films set in 2015
Films set in London
Films set on the London Underground
Films set on trains
Films set in England
Films shot in Buckinghamshire
Films shot in England
Films shot in London
2010s monster movies
British werewolf films
British exploitation films
British splatter films
2010s English-language films
2010s British films
British supernatural horror films